Góes is a Brazilian surname. Notable people with the surname include:

 Allan Góes (born 1971), Brazilian mixed martial artist
 Eduardo de Góes "Edu" Lobo (born 1943), Brazilian bossa nova singer
 Júlio Góes (born 1955), Brazilian tennis player
 Fabio Góes (born 1975), Brazilian songwriter
 Waldez Góes (born 1961), Brazilian politician

Portuguese-language surnames